This was the first edition of the tournament.

Conner Huertas del Pino and Mats Rosenkranz won the title after Matías Franco Descotte and Facundo Díaz Acosta retired leading 6–5 in the first set of the final.

Seeds

Draw

References

External links
 Main draw

Challenger de Tigre - Doubles